Akiya was according to the Assyrian King List (AKL) the 29th Assyrian monarch, ruling in Assyria's early period. He is listed within a section of the AKL as the third out of the six, "kings whose eponyms are not known." As all the other early rulers listed in the king list and unattested elsewhere, there is dispute among scholars as to whether Akiya was a real historical figure.

See also

 Timeline of the Assyrian Empire
 Early Period of Assyria
 List of Assyrian kings
 Assyrian continuity
 Assyrian people

References

21st-century BC Assyrian kings